Raysville is an unincorporated community in Wayne Township, Henry County, Indiana.

History
Raysville was laid out and platted in 1832. The community was named for James B. Ray, 4th Governor of Indiana. A post office was established at Raysville in 1830, and remained in operation until it was discontinued in 1907.

Geography

References

Unincorporated communities in Henry County, Indiana
Unincorporated communities in Indiana
1832 establishments in Indiana